JOELib is computer software, a chemical expert system used mainly to interconvert chemical file formats. Because of its strong relationship to informatics, this program belongs more to the category cheminformatics than to molecular modelling. It is available for Windows, Unix and other operating systems supporting the programming language Java. It is free and open-source software distributed under the GNU General Public License (GPL) 2.0.

History
JOELib and OpenBabel were derived from the OELib Cheminformatics library.

Logo
The project logo is just the word JOELib in the Tengwar script of J. R. R. Tolkien. The letters are grouped as JO-E-Li-b. Vowels are usually grouped together with a consonant, but two following vowels must be separated by a helper construct.

Major features
 Chemical expert system
 Query and substructure search (based on Simplified molecular-input line-entry system (SMARTS), a SMILES extension
 Clique detection
 QSAR
 Data mining
 Molecule mining, special case of Structured Data Mining
 Feature–descriptor calculation
 Partition coefficient, log P
 Rule-of-five
 Partial charges
 Fingerprint calculation
 etc.
 Chemical file formats
 Chemical table file: MDL Molfile, SD format
 SMILES
 Gaussian
 Chemical Markup Language
 MOPAC

See also
 OpenBabel - C++ version of JOELib-OELib
 Jmol
 Chemistry Development Kit (CDK)
 Comparison of software for molecular mechanics modeling
 Blue Obelisk
 Molecule editor
List of free and open-source software packages

References
 The Blue Obelisk-Interoperability in Chemical Informatics, Rajarshi Guha, Michael T. Howard, Geoffrey R. Hutchison, Peter Murray-Rust, Henry Rzepa, Christoph Steinbeck, Jörg K. Wegner, and Egon L. Willighagen, J. Chem. Inf. Model.; 2006;

External links
  at SourceForge
 Algorithm dictionary

Free science software
Free software programmed in Java (programming language)
Computational chemistry software
Science software for Linux